Clypeosectus curvus is a species of sea snail, a marine gastropod mollusk in the family Lepetodrilidae.

Description

Distribution
This marine species is found at thermal vents, Juan de Fuca Ridge, Northeast Pacific

References

External links

Lepetodrilidae
Gastropods described in 1989